Symphony No. 5 may refer to:

Symphony No. 5 (Alwyn) (Hydriotaphia) by William Alwyn, 1972–73
Symphony No. 5 (Arnold) (Op. 74) by Malcolm Arnold, 1961
Symphony No. 5 (Bax) by Arnold Bax, 1932
Symphony No. 5 (Beethoven) in C minor (Op. 67, Victory) by Ludwig van Beethoven, 1804–08
Symphony No. 5 (Bentoiu) (Op. 26) by Pascal Bentoiu, 1979
Symphony No. 5 (Bruckner) in B-flat major (WAB 105, Fantastic) by Anton Bruckner, 1875–76
Symphony No. 5 (Chávez) (Symphony for Strings) by Carlos Chávez, 1953
Symphony No. 5 (Ching) (Kunstkammer) by Jeffrey Ching, 2004–05
Symphony No. 5 (Davies) by Peter Maxwell Davies, 1994
Symphony No. 5 (Diamond) by David Diamond, 1947–64
Symphony No. 5 (Dvořák) in F major (Op. 76, B. 54) by Antonín Dvořák, 1875
Symphony No. 5 (Enescu) in D major by George Enescu, 1941, completed by Pascal Bentoiu, 1995
Symphony No. 5 (Ficher) (Op. 63, Asi habló Isaías) by Jacobo Ficher, 1947
Symphony No. 5 (Gillis) In Memoriam by Don Gillis, 1944–45
Symphony No. 5 (Glass) (Requiem, Bardo, Nirmanakaya) by Philip Glass, 1999
Symphony No. 5 (Glazunov) in B-flat major (Op. 55, Heroic) by Alexander Glazunov, 1895
Symphony No. 5 (Hanson) (Op.43, Sinfonia Sacra) by Howard Hanson, 1955
Symphony No. 5 (Harbison) by John Harbison, 2008
Symphony No. 5 (Harris) by Roy Harris, 1940–42, rev. 1945
Symphony No. 5 (Haydn) in A major (Hoboken I/5) by Joseph Haydn, 1760–62
Symphony No. 5 (Michael Haydn) in A major (Perger 3, Sherman 5, MH 63) by Michael Haydn, 1763
Symphony No. 5 (Henze) by Hans Werner Henze, 1962
Symphony No. 5 (Honegger) (Di tre re) by Arthur Honegger, 1950
Symphony No. 5 (Mahler) by Gustav Mahler, 1901–02
Symphony No. 5 (Martinů) (H. 310) by Bohuslav Martinů, 1946
Symphony No. 5 (Melartin) (Op. 90, Sinfonia brevis) by Erkki Melartin, 1915
Symphony No. 5 (Mendelssohn) in D (Op. 107, Reformation) by Felix Mendelssohn, 1830
Symphony No. 5 (Mennin) by Peter Mennin, 1950
Symphony No. 5 (Milhaud) (Op. 322) by Darius Milhaud, 1953
Symphony No. 5 (Mozart) in B-flat major (K. 22) by Wolfgang Amadeus Mozart, 1765
Symphony No. 5 (Nielsen) (Op. 50, FS 97) by Carl Nielsen, 1920–22
Symphony No. 5 (Penderecki) (Korean) by Krzysztof Penderecki, 1991–92
Symphony No. 5 (Piston) by Walter Piston, 1954
Symphony No. 5 (Prokofiev) in B-flat major (Op. 100) by Sergei Prokofiev, 1944
Symphony No. 5 (Raff) in E major (Op. 177, Lenore) by Joachim Raff, 1870–72
Symphony No. 5 (Rautavaara) by Einojuhani Rautavaara, 1985–86
Symphony No. 5 (Ries) in D minor (Op. 112) by Ferdinand Ries, 1813
Symphony No. 5 (Rochberg) by George Rochberg, 1896
Symphony No. 5 (Rouse) by Christopher Rouse, 2015
Symphony No. 5 (Rubbra) (Op. 63) by Edmund Rubbra, 1947
Symphony No. 5 (Sallinen) (Op. 57, Washington Mosaics) by Aulis Sallinen, 1984–85 (r. 1987)
Symphony No. 5 (Schnittke) (Concerto Grosso No. 4) by Alfred Schnittke, 1988
Symphony No. 5 (Schubert) in B-flat major (D. 485) by Franz Schubert, 1816
Symphony No. 5 (Sessions) by Roger Sessions, 1960–64
Symphony No. 5 (Shostakovich) in D minor (Op. 47) by Dmitri Shostakovich, 1937
Symphony No. 5 (Sibelius) in E-flat major (Op. 82) by Jean Sibelius, 1915–19
Symphony No. 5 (Simpson) by Robert Simpson, 1972
Symphony No. 5 (Tchaikovsky) in E minor (Op. 64) by Pyotr Ilyich Tchaikovsky, 1888
Symphony No. 5 (Ustvolskaya) (Amen) by Galina Ustvolskaya, 1989–90
Symphony No. 5 (Vaughan Williams) in D major by Ralph Vaughan Williams, 1938–43
Symphony No. 5 (Vieru) by Anatol Vieru, 1984–85
Symphony No. 5 (Villa-Lobos) (W170, Peace) by Heitor Villa-Lobos, 1920
Symphony No. 5 (Williamson) (Aquerò) by Malcolm Williamson, 1979–80

See also
Symphony for Organ No. 5 (Widor) in F minor (Op. 42 No. 1) by Charles-Marie Widor, 1879, including Widor's Toccata
Symphony No. 5½ (Gillis) (A Symphony for Fun) by Don Gillis, 1946

005